Global Information Network could refer to:

Global Information Network, a non-profit news agency with a focus on Africa
Global Information Network Architecture
A club which was started by Kevin Trudeau and offered training on success.